The Independent Alternative for Italians Abroad (AIIE) was a party list that contested the 2006 Italian general election in the overseas division of North America and Central America. It ran four candidates for the Chamber of Deputies and two candidates for the Italian Senate. The party did not win any seats.

The AIIE supported improvements in consular and health-care services for Italians living abroad, and was generally focused on interactions between Italy and the country's diaspora population. One candidate for the Italian Chamber of Deputies indicated that the party was neither right-wing nor left-wing, and that it opposed bureaucracy while supporting freedom for both the individual and society. Another party candidate for the Italian Senate said that the AIIE was seeking to reach an electorate of moderate and undecided voters.

Electoral record

References

Italian expatriate representation parties